Abdulkariem Ibrahim Hamid, more commonly known by his nom de guerre Jaarraa Abbaa Gadaa, was a prominent member of the Oromo nationalist movement and one of the leaders of the first Oromo Liberation Army. and the founder of the first Oromo Liberation Front.

References 

1936 births
2013 deaths
Guerrillas
Oromo Liberation Front
Oromo people